Mario Toros (9 December 1922 – 3 June 2018) was a Friulian politician for the Christian Democracy and trade unionist.

Biography 
Toros was born on December 9, 1922 in Pagnacco, Italy. He is of Friulian descent and has been an active advocate for them, going so far as being president of the Friuli nel Mondo.

He was a Deputy from 1958 to 1972 and as a Senator from 1972 to 1987.

He served as Minister for Regional Affairs from 7 July 1973 to 23 November 1974 and as Minister of Labor and Social Security from 23 November 1974 to 29 July 1976.

For over twenty years he was president of the organization Friuli in the world, of which he was honorary president, as well as having actively worked for the Onlus Cjase Foundation by the Furlans of Villalta (Fagagna).

He died on June 3, 2018 in Udine.

References

External links 

 Italian Parliament Page
 Italian Senate Page

1922 births
2018 deaths
Christian Democracy (Italy) politicians
Christian Democracy (Italy) members of the Chamber of Deputies (Italy)
Deputies of Legislature III of Italy
Deputies of Legislature IV of Italy
Deputies of Legislature V of Italy
Senators of Legislature VI of Italy
Senators of Legislature VII of Italy
Senators of Legislature VIII of Italy
Senators of Legislature IX of Italy
People from the Province of Udine